German submarine U-953 was a Type VIIC U-boat of Nazi Germany's navy (Kriegsmarine) during World War II.

The submarine was laid down on 10 February 1942 in the Blohm & Voss yard at Hamburg, launched on 28 October 1942, and commissioned on 17 December 1942 under the command of Oberleutnant zur See Karl-Heinz Marbach.

After training with the 5th U-boat Flotilla at Kiel, U-953 was transferred to the 3rd U-boat Flotilla based at La Pallice (in southwestern France), for front-line service on 1 June 1943. She sailed on ten war patrols with no ships sunk. She was transferred to the 33rd U-boat Flotilla on 15 October 1944, under the command of her second skipper, Oberleutnant zur See Herbert Werner, author of the memoir Iron Coffins. U-953 was surrendered at Trondheim in Norway on 9 May 1945.

Design
German Type VIIC submarines were preceded by the shorter Type VIIB submarines. U-953 had a displacement of  when at the surface and  while submerged. She had two shafts and two  propellers.

U-953 was fitted with five  torpedo tubes (four fitted at the bow and one at the stern), fourteen torpedoes, one  SK C/35 naval gun, 220 rounds, and one twin  C/30 anti-aircraft gun. The boat had a complement of between forty-four and sixty.

Service history

First patrol
U-953 first sailed from Kiel on 13 May 1943, and out into the mid-Atlantic. She had no successes, and on 9 July was attacked by an aircraft, which killed one crewman and wounded two others. The U-boat arrived at La Pallice on 22 July after 71 days on patrol.

Second and third patrols
U-953s second Atlantic patrol from 2 October until 17 November 1943 was uneventful, but her next, which began on 26 December 1943 and took her to the waters off North Africa, was. On 11 January 1944 the U-boat fired a T-5 homing torpedo at a corvette, missed, and was then hunted for the next 13 hours by escort ships equipped with depth charges and hedgehogs. About 4 February the U-boat approached Convoy ON 222, but was attacked by an unknown Allied aircraft.

Fourth to sixth patrols
After being fitted with a Schnorchel underwater-breathing apparatus, the U-boat's next three patrols from March to June 1944 were short, from 3 to 13 days and uneventful.

Seventh patrol
U-953 sailed on 24 June 1944 from Brest into the English Channel.

Eighth to tenth patrols
Under her new commander, Oberleutnant zur See Herbert Werner, U-953 sailed from Brest on 12 August 1944, arriving at La Pallice on 19 August.

On 31 August U-953 left La Pallice for Norway, sailing round the Atlantic coast of Ireland. She patrolled the entrance to North Channel for seven days, but has no success. Werner reports a fault on the submarine snorkel caused the patrol to be abandoned and U-953 arrived at Bergen "unannounced" on 11 October.

Faults and a need for overhaul caused her to be sent to Germany, arriving at Flensburg on 25 October. She was not ready for further service until February 1945.

U-953 left Kiel on 4 February 1945, arriving at Kristiansand and then Bergen.
On 21 February she left Bergen on an offensive patrol off the coast of Britain but, Werner reports, various faults culminating in a faulty torpedo tube door, forced a return once more. U-953 arrived back in Bergen on 3 April 1945.

Under a new commander, Oberleutnant zur See Erich Steinbrink, she was moved from there to Trondheim on 6 April arriving three days later; there she remained until the German capitulation and she was surrendered to British forces.

Wolfpacks
U-953 took part in seven wolfpacks, namely:
 Trutz (1 – 16 June 1943)
 Trutz 2 (16 – 29 June 1943)
 Geier 2 (30 June – 15 July 1943)
 Schill (25 October – 16 November 1943)
 Borkum (1 – 3 January 1944)
 Borkum 3 (3 – 13 January 1944)
 Dragoner (22 – 28 May 1944)

Fate
On 29 May 1945, U-953 sailed to Loch Ryan as a British war prize in August. After trials by the Royal Navy, the U-boat was laid up in Lisahally at the end of the year. On 4 June 1949, U-953 was sold to Clayton & Davie Ltd. of Dunston and broken up for scrap.

See also
 "U-Boats, Churchill's Worst Nightmare" 3 DVD set; includes interviews with Captain Werner (U-953)

References

Sources

External links

German Type VIIC submarines
U-boats commissioned in 1942
World War II submarines of Germany
1942 ships
Ships built in Hamburg
Maritime incidents in May 1943